The name Monaster (one star) can refer to:
 Monaster, a genus of prehistoric starfish
 Monaster, an alternate name for Niculițel, a small Romanian commune